The 2001–02 All-Ireland Senior Club Hurling Championship was the 32nd staging of the All-Ireland Senior Club Hurling Championship, the Gaelic Athletic Association's premier inter-county club hurling tournament. The championship began on 20 October 2001 and ended on 17 March 2002.

Athenry were the defending champions but were defeated by Clarinbridge in the county championship and thus failed to qualify. Clarinbridge, O'Loughlin Gaels, Adare and Clonkill were all first-time participants in the championship, while Kilmoyley and Ballinkillen made returns after prolonged absences.

On 17 March 2002, Birr won the championship following a 2-10 to 1-5 defeat of Clarinbridge in the All-Ireland final. This was their third All-Ireland title overall and their first title in four championship seasons.

Ballygunner's Paul Flynn was the championship's top scorer with 1-42.

Results

Connacht Senior Club Hurling Championship

First round

Second round

Semi-final

Final

Leinster Senior Club Hurling Championship

First round

Quarter-finals

Semi-finals

Final

Final replay

Munster Senior Club Hurling Championship

Quarter-finals

Semi-finals

Final

Ulster Senior Club Hurling Championship

Semi-finals

Final

All-Ireland Senior Club Hurling Championship

Quarter-finals

Semi-finals

Final

Top scorers

Overall

Single game

References

2001 in hurling
2002 in hurling
All-Ireland Senior Club Hurling Championship